Eurasian Resources Group (ERG) S.à r.l. is a large mining and raw materials supplier with operations in Kazakhstan and Central Africa. In its current form, the company began in December 2013 after it acquired the Eurasian Natural Resources Corporation (previously a public limited company), which was delisted from the London Stock Exchange and Kazakhstan Stock Exchange. Major shareholders of the company include the Republic of Kazakhstan (40%) and the "trio" of Kazakh oligarchs Alexander Mashkevitch, Alijan Ibragimov, and Patokh Chodiev.

History
The Eurasian Natural Resources Corporation (ENRC) was taken private in 2013 amid falling share price and ongoing criminal investigation of ENRC from the UK Serious Fraud Office. ERNC's counter-suit that the investigation was conducted improperly was dismissed in 2022.

At the beginning of 2014 the company restructured, introducing new corporate governance and compliance policies and new management. In 2017, the company secured $2.5 billion in financing from Chinese banks as part of the Belt and Road Initiative. Projects included cobalt mining in Africa and an expanded aluminum plant in Kazakhstan.

Alexander Machkevitch is Chairman of the Board of Managers of Eurasian Resources Group and Mr Benedikt Sobotka is Chief Executive Officer.

Operations
Eurasian Resources Group owns fully integrated mining, processing, energy production, logistics and marketing operations. With a product portfolio in steelmaking materials, non-ferrous and energy, it is the world's largest producer of Ferro chrome by chrome content. ERG supplies electricity in Central Asia, where they are also a large railway operator.

In Kazakhstan, the group's major assets include: TNC Kaz chrome, Sokolov Sarbai Mining Production Association (SSGPO), Aluminum of Kazakhstan (AOK), Kazakhstan Aluminum Smelter (KAS), Eurasian Energy Corporation (EEC), Shubarkol Komir and Trans Com.

In Africa, ERG owns production and development stage assets in the Democratic Republic of Congo (DRC), Zambia, Zimbabwe, South Africa, Mozambique and Mali.

In Brazil it develops the Piedra de Ferro iron ore production complex and the Porto Sul deep water port, both of which are in the State of Bahia.

Since 2014 the Group sold assets worth about US$1 billion, including zinc mines to Glencore.

References

External links
Official website
Eurasian Resources Group in Kazakhstan
Eurasian Resources Group in Brazil: Bahia Mineração
Bloomberg: Company Overview of Eurasian Resources Group S.à r.l.
Eurasian Resources Group is a strategic partner associate of the World Economic Forum

Companies established in 1994
Metal companies of Luxembourg
Iron ore mining companies